Peter Courtney is a politician in Oregon, United States.

Peter Courtney  may also refer to:

Peter Courtney (MP) (1616–1670), English politician
Peter Courtney (boxer) (1867–1896), American boxer in Corbett and Courtney Before the Kinetograph

See also
Peter Courtenay (disambiguation)